The River Café is a restaurant in the Borough of Hammersmith and Fulham, London, specialising in Italian cuisine. It was owned and run by chefs Ruth Rogers and Rose Gray until Gray's death in 2010; since then, Rogers has been the sole owner and has run the restaurant.

Location

The restaurant is located on the north bank of the Thames in Hammersmith, in the former Duckhams oil storage facility; the nearest railway station being Hammersmith tube station. The facility was modified to alternative use by architect Lord Rogers, the husband of Ruth Rogers (Lady Rogers). The restaurant originally opened in 1987 as the employee café of the architectural partnership. The restaurant has a garden area with views of the River Thames.

Culinary direction

Signature dishes include: wild mushroom risotto; Dover sole and John Dory smoked in the restaurant's own wood stove; and rich Italian desserts including lemon almond cake and the chocolate "Nemesis" cake.

The restaurant earned a Michelin star in 1997 and is critically acclaimed.

The River Café is also notable for the number of successful chefs that have trained in its kitchens. These include Theo Randall, Ed Baines of Randall & Aubin, April Bloomfield of The Spotted Pig in New York, and celebrity chefs Jamie Oliver, Hugh Fearnley-Whittingstall, Ben O'Donoghue and Tobie Puttock.

Cookery books and recognition
Gray and Rogers have written six cookbooks, including Italian Easy and The London River Café Cook Book. Their first book, Italian Country Cookbook won the Glenfiddich Award for Food Book of the Year and the BCA Illustrated Book of the Year award. Rogers and Gray have since presented a 12-part series for Channel 4, The Italian Kitchen.

Rogers and Gray each were named in the 2010 New Year's Honours List as Members of the British Empire (MBE) with the citation "for services to the Hospitality Industry".

On 28 February 2010, Gray died of cancer, aged 71.

See also
 List of Italian restaurants

References

Further reading
 Rose Gray and Ruth Rogers - The River Café Cook Book (Ebury Press, 1996)

External links
 Official website

Buildings and structures in the London Borough of Hammersmith and Fulham
Italian restaurants in the United Kingdom
Michelin Guide starred restaurants in the United Kingdom
European restaurants in London
Tourist attractions in the London Borough of Hammersmith and Fulham
Restaurants established in 1987